A university college is a college institution that provides tertiary education but does not have full or independent university status.

University college or University College may also refer to:

 University college (Scandinavia), institutions that grant degrees on limited extents

Australia
 University College (University of Melbourne)

Canada

Alberta 
 Canadian University College, Lacombe; former name of Burman University
 Concordia University College of Alberta, Edmonton; former name of Concordia University of Edmonton
 King's University College (Edmonton); former name of The King's University

British Columbia 
 Kwantlen University College, Greater Vancouver; former name of Kwantlen Polytechnic University
 Malsapina University College, Nanaimo; former name of Vancouver Island University
 University College of the Cariboo, Kamloops, British Columbia; merged with British Columbia Open University to become Thompson Rivers University
 University College of the Fraser Valley, Fraser Valley

Manitoba 
 University College of the North, The Pas
 Booth University College, Winnipeg

Ontario 
 University College, University of Toronto
 University of Waterloo, affiliate colleges:
 Conrad Grebel University College
 Renison University College
 St. Paul's University College
 University of Western Ontario, affiliated colleges:
 Brescia University College
 Huron University College
 King's University College (University of Western Ontario)
 University College (University of Western Ontario), a building on the campus of the University of Western Ontario
 Algoma University College, Sault Ste. Marie; former name of Laurentian University

Denmark 

 Metropolitan University College, Copenhagen; formerly CVU Øresund, The Danish Teacher Training, National Management College, the Social School, Frederiksberg Seminarium and Suhr's Seminarium
 University College Capital, formerly Greater Copenhagen CVU and CVU Copenhagen & North Zealand
 University College Lillebaelt, formerly CVU Fyn, CVU Jelling, CVSU Fyn and the Social College of Odense
 University College of Northern Denmark
 University College Sealand, formerly South CDE and CDE Zealand
 University College South, formerly CDE Sønderjylland
 VIA University College, central Denmark; formerly CVU'erne (Center for Higher Education)
 West Jutland University College, Esbjerg; formerly CVU Vest

India
 Pachhunga University College, Aizawl
 University College, Trivandrum, Thiruvananthapuram, Kerala
 University College of Engineering, Thodupuzha, Kerala
 University College of Medical Sciences, New Delhi

Ireland
National University of Ireland, Galway, formerly University College, Galway
University College Cork, formerly University College, Cork
University College Dublin, formerly University College, Dublin

Netherlands
Amsterdam University College, founded by University of Amsterdam and the VU University Amsterdam
Erasmus University College, the undergraduate college of Erasmus University Rotterdam
Leiden University College The Hague, part of Leiden University
University College Groningen, a faculty of University of Groningen
University College Maastricht, part of Maastricht University
Utrecht University, honors colleges:
University College Roosevelt, Middelburg, Zeeland
University College Utrecht

New Zealand
University College, Otago, Dunedin

Nigeria
University of Ibadan, formerly University College, Ibadan

Norway
 Arctic University of Norway, formed from the merger of:
 Finnmark University College
 Harstad University College
 Narvik University College
 Tromsø University College
 Bergen University College, one of the colleges that joined to become Western Norway University of Applied Sciences
 Lillehammer University College, part of Inland Norway University of Applied Sciences
 Molde University College
 Nord University, formed from the merger of:
 Bodø University College
 Nesna University College
 Nord-Trøndelag University College
 Norwegian University of Science and Technology (NTNU), formed from the merger of:
 Aalesund University College
 Gjøvik University College
 Sør-Trøndelag University College
 Oslo and Akershus University College, former name of Oslo Metropolitan University
 Østfold University College
 Sogn og Fjordane University College
 Stavanger University College
 Stord/Haugesund University College
 University College of Southeast Norway, formed from the merger of:
 Buskerud and Vestfold University College
 Telemark University College
 Volda University College (Høgskolen i Volda)

Pakistan
 Government College University, Lahore
 Islamia College University

United Kingdom

Colleges of universities 
University College, Durham, the founding college of the University of Durham
University College, Oxford, the oldest college of the University of Oxford, established in 1249
University College London, a founding college of the University of London
University College Hospital, a hospital in London, founded as part of University College London
University College School, a private school in Hampstead, founded as part of University College London
 Wolfson College, Cambridge, a college of the University of Cambridge, formerly called University College, Cambridge

Former university colleges 
Arts University Bournemouth, formerly The Arts University College at Bournemouth
Buckinghamshire New University, High Wycombe; formerly Buckinghamshire Chilterns University College
Falmouth University, formerly University College Falmouth
Harper Adams University, Edgmond; formerly Harper Adams University College
Newman University, Birmingham; formerly Newman University College
Norwich University of the Arts, formerly Norwich University College of the Arts
Royal Agricultural University, Cirencester; formerly Royal Agricultural College
St Mary's University, Twickenham; formerly St Mary's University College
 University College Birmingham, formerly Birmingham College of Food, Tourism and Creative Studies until January 2008
 University College, Bristol, predecessor institute of the University of Bristol
 University for the Creative Arts, formerly University College for the Creative Arts at Canterbury, Epsom, Farnham, Maidstone and Rochester
 University of St Mark & St John (commonly known as Marjon), Plymouth; formerly University College Plymouth St Mark & St John

University colleges 
 Ifs University College, the London Institute of Banking & Finance
 St Mary's University College, Belfast
 Stranmillis University College, Belfast
 University College of Estate Management, Reading

United States
 University College, an undergraduate college of Arizona State University
 University College, an undergraduate college of Sacred Heart University, Connecticut
 University College, an undergraduate college of the University of Northern Colorado
 University College University of Denver, online and evening programs for working adults at the University of Denver, Colorado
 Kennesaw State University University College, an undergraduate college of Kennesaw State University, Georgia
 University of Maryland University College, focusing on "non-traditional" students
 University College, the adult evening and professional studies division of Arts & Sciences at Washington University in St. Louis, Missouri
 University College (Rutgers University), New Jersey
 University College, an undergraduate college of the University of Toledo, Ohio
 University College, an undergraduate college of the University of Oklahoma
 University College, a college of Texas Tech University
 University College, an undergraduate college of the University of Rhode Island
 University College, an undergraduate college of Washington State University

See also
 College (disambiguation)
 University (disambiguation)